Draycott in the Clay is a village and civil parish within the English county of Staffordshire.

Location 
The nearest railway station is at Uttoxeter. The village is dominated by the A515 which runs through the village. to the south of the village is The National Forest and to the north is a traction engine park.

Village Facilities 
The village has two churches, a village shop/Post Office, two public houses, one school and a play area.

See also
Listed buildings in Draycott in the Clay

References 

Villages in Staffordshire
Borough of East Staffordshire